Transmembrane protein 219 also known as insulin-like growth factor-binding protein 3 receptor or IGFBP-3R is a protein that in humans is encoded by the TMEM219 gene.  IGFBP-3R acts as a cell death receptor for IGFBP3.

References